Dick Cunningham (born July 11, 1946) is an American retired professional basketball player.

A 6'10" center born in Canton, Ohio, Cunningham led NCAA Division I in rebounding as a junior at Murray State University with a school-record 21.8 rebounds per game in the 1966–67 season. He was selected to the All-Ohio Valley Conference basketball team in 1967 and 1968. In three seasons with the Murray State varsity, Cunningham scored 981 points and grabbed 1,292 rebounds in 71 games. His 479 rebounds in 1966–67 and his career rebounding average of 18.2 rebounds per game still stand as Murray State records. He was inducted into the Murray State Athletics Hall of Fame in 1986.

Cunningham was the 21st overall selection in the 1968 National Basketball Association draft by the Phoenix Suns and also was picked by the New York Nets in the American Basketball Association draft. Traded by the Suns to the Milwaukee Bucks before the 1968–69 season, Cunningham played seven seasons (1968–1975) in the NBA as a member of the Bucks and Houston Rockets. He averaged 2.8 points per game and 3.7 rebounds per game in his career and won an NBA championship with Milwaukee in 1971.

NBA career statistics

Regular season

|-
| align="left" | 1968–69
| align="left" | Milwaukee
| 77 || - || 16.1 || .425 || - || .651 || 5.7 || 0.8 || - || - || 4.6
|-
| align="left" | 1969–70
| align="left" | Milwaukee
| 60 || - || 6.9 || .369 || - || .667 || 2.7 || 0.5 || - || - || 2.1
|-
| align="left" | 1970–71
| align="left" | Milwaukee
| 76 || - || 8.9 || .415 || - || .661 || 3.4 || 0.6 || - || - || 2.6
|-
| align="left" | 1971–72
| align="left" | Houston
| 63 || - || 11.4 || .385 || - || .698 || 3.9 || 0.9 || - || - || 2.7
|-
| align="left" | 1972–73
| align="left" | Milwaukee
| 72 || - || 9.6 || .410 || - || .580 || 2.9 || 0.5 || - || - || 2.2
|-
| align="left" | 1973–74
| align="left" | Milwaukee
| 8 || - || 5.6 || .500 || - || .000 || 2.0 || 0.0 || 0.3 || 0.3 || 0.8
|-
| align="left" | 1974–75
| align="left" | Milwaukee
| 2 || - || 4.0 || .000 || - || .000 || 1.0 || 0.5 || 0.0 || 0.0 || 0.0
|- class="sortbottom"
| style="text-align:center;" colspan="2"| Career
| 358 || - || 10.6 || .406 || - || .636 || 3.7 || 0.6 || 0.2 || 0.2 || 2.8
|}

Playoffs

|-
| align="left" | 1969–70
| align="left" | Milwaukee
| 8 || - || 5.6 || .556 || - || .500 || 1.5 || 0.3 || - || - || 2.6
|-
| align="left" | 1970–71
| align="left" | Milwaukee
| 14 || - || 6.4 || .429 || - || .667 || 1.7 || 0.1 || - || - || 1.7
|-
| align="left" | 1972–73
| align="left" | Milwaukee
| 5 || - || 3.4 || 1.000 || - || .000 || 0.6 || 0.4 || - || - || 0.4
|- class="sortbottom"
| style="text-align:center;" colspan="2"| Career
| 27 || - || 5.6 || .500 || - || .636 || 1.4 || 0.2 || - || - || 1.7
|}

See also
List of NCAA Division I men's basketball season rebounding leaders

References

1946 births
Living people
Basketball players from Canton, Ohio
Centers (basketball)
Houston Rockets players
Milwaukee Bucks players
Murray State Racers men's basketball players
Phoenix Suns draft picks
American men's basketball players